Phyllostachys dulcis  is a species of bamboo found in  Fujian, Jiangsu, Zhejiang provinces of China. This species is cultivated for its edible shoots.

References

External links
 
 

dulcis